Gorgoleptis patulus is a species of sea snail, a marine gastropod mollusk in the family Lepetodrilidae.

Description

Distribution

References

Lepetodrilidae
Gastropods described in 1988